Luis Felipe Martínez Sánchez (born May 26, 1955) is a retired Cuban boxer, who represented his native country at the 1976 Summer Olympics in Montreal, Quebec, Canada. There he won the bronze medal in the middleweight division (– 71 kg) after being defeated in the semifinals by Rufat Riskiyev from the Soviet Union. Two years later he won the silver medal at the second World Championships in Belgrade.

References
 databaseOlympics

1955 births
Living people
Middleweight boxers
Boxers at the 1976 Summer Olympics
Olympic boxers of Cuba
Olympic bronze medalists for Cuba
Olympic medalists in boxing
Medalists at the 1976 Summer Olympics
Cuban male boxers
AIBA World Boxing Championships medalists
20th-century Cuban people